Kırklarelispor is a Turkish sports club founded in 1968 is currently playing in the TFF Second League. The club's colours are green and white. They play their home matches at the Kırklareli Atatürk Stadium.

Current squad

Out on loan

References

External links
 Official website
 Kırklarelispor on TFF.org

Football clubs in Turkey
1968 establishments in Turkey
Association football clubs established in 1968
Sport in Kırklareli